Topocentric may refer to:

 a horizontal coordinate system, used for e.g. navigational purposes
 a proposed astrological ordering system from 1964